Pananchery Mudikkode Shiva Temple is an ancient Hindu temple dedicated to Shiva at Pananchery of Thrissur District in Kerala state in India. The presiding deity of the temple is Shiva, located in main Sanctum Sanctorum, facing West. According to folklore, sage Parashurama has installed the idol. The temple is a part of the 108 famous Shiva temples in Kerala.

See also
 108 Shiva Temples
 Temples of Kerala
 Hindu temples in Thrissur Rural

References

Shiva temples in Kerala
Hindu temples in Thrissur
108 Shiva Temples